The Mid-Norfolk Railway has a large collection of heritage rolling stock, mostly relating to the post-war British Railways-era, from the 1950s to 1990s. The line holds several rolling-stock accomplishments:
 Owners of the first DMU vehicle to enter preservation.
 First Second Generation DMU used on a heritage railway.
 First complete set of coaches in the blue-grey livery on a heritage line.
 First complete set of coaches in the InterCity Executive livery on a heritage line.
 First heritage railway to operate an air-conditioned Mk2 carriage in service.
 First operational Mk3 carriage on a heritage line.

Maintenance facilities
The main restoration depot is at Dereham. The three-road shed, built with a £100,000 European Union (EU) grant, has space to accommodate nine standard length coaches, steam or diesel locomotives. Additional secure storage sidings have been built near Kimberley, relating to a main-line contract.  With the Mid-Norfolk being connected to the main Breckland secondary main line, the company's maintenance facilities are also employed for the regional Network Rail Rail Head Treatment Train (RHTT) during the autumn period.

Locomotives and multiple units

Steam locomotives and shunters 
Until 2019 there were no steam locomotives based on the line, with the Mid-Norfolk hiring steam locomotives based on other railways for use during the Summer season and most remaining services utilising diesel traction. Sentinel 4wVBT 9596 "George" and Robert Stephenson & Hawthorns 0-4-0ST 7818 "Castle Donington Power Station No. 2" are stored in the former yard at Yaxham, independently of the MNR. Great Western Railway 0-6-0 PT '9466' was a regular visitor to the line, but wasn't based at Dereham.

Diesel locomotives and shunters

Multiple units and railcars

Passenger stock

BR Mk1 Carriages 

British Railways Mark 1 is the family designation for the first standardised designs of railway carriages built by British Railways from 1951 until 1974. Following nationalisation in 1948, the Mark 1 was intended to be the standard carriage design for use across all lines, incorporating the best features of each of the former companies' designs. It was also designed to be much stronger than previous designs, to provide better protection for passengers in the event of a collision or derailment.

Passenger carrying vehicles

Non-passenger carrying vehicles

BR Mk2 Carriages 

The Mark 2 family of railway carriages were British Rail's second design of carriages, built between 1964 and 1975. They were of steel construction. The MNR project to create a complete set of coaches in the blue-grey livery introduced in 1964 was a first in preservation.  Several of the coaches feature Edward Pond murals fitted during refurbishment when in Network SouthEast service. A third set, owned by a group based on the line, was the first set in preservation to wear InterCity Executive livery.

Vacuum brake set

Air brake set

Non-passenger carrying vehicles

BR Mk3 Carriages 

The Mid-Norfolk Railway also operates British Rail Mark 3 vehicles in service. The Mark 3 was developed in response to growing competition from airlines and the car in the 1960s. Originally conceived as locomotive-hauled coaching stock, the first coaches built, in 1972, were for the prototype HST. Production coaches entered service between 1975 and 1988. Mk3a FO 11024, a crash-damaged spares vehicle owned by National Express East Anglia, was stored on the MNR between 2008 and June 2010, and DVT 82104 was stored at Dereham during 2012, but neither was part of the railway's fleet.

Passenger Vehicles

Refurbished Mark 3 Passenger Vehicles 
In 2020 the railway purchased a fleet of 19 refurbished Mk3 carriages that had been retired from the Norwich to London services. These vehicles had been refurbished in 2016, fitted with eco-toilets, LED lighting and refreshed interiors.

Refurbished Pullman Vehicles 
Among the coaches purchased after use on Greater Anglia were four former InterCity Manchester Pullman coaches.

Driving Vehicle Trailers

Sleeping Cars

Goods and engineering wagons 

The Mid-Norfolk has a varied collection of goods wagons. They are usually used for works trains and demonstrations at various times of the year. This includes examples of covered and open wagons, tank wagons, including a milk tank wagon of the type once used over the line on the North Elmham milk trains and the following examples of brake vans.

Cranes, runners and specialist plant

Former Mid-Norfolk Railway rolling stock 

Since the preservation reopening of the line, several items of rolling stock have worked or been based on the Mid-Norfolk Railway, but have since departed. A number of vehicles have also been stripped and partially (or fully) scrapped on the railway. This section details those items (excluding visiting charter and freight locomotives).

Most of the Stadler FLIRT units being delivered to Greater Anglia were stabled on the line prior to entering service, with many of the retired Mk3 coaches also visiting, but these are not included in the records.

Steam locomotives and shunters previously based on the MNR

Diesel locomotives and shunters previously based on the MNR

Multiple units and railcars previously based on the MNR

Carriages previously based on the MNR

Eastern Rail Services vehicles
While the company was being established, a number of vehicles owned by Eastern Rail Services were operated or stored on the line.

Riviera Trains vehicles
Spot-hire carriages owned by Riviera Trains were based on the line until 2022, for use on special events.

Visiting steam locomotives 

Visiting steam locomotives that have operated on the preserved Mid-Norfolk Railway are shown in the following table:

Visiting diesel and electric locomotives 

In addition to locomotives based on the line, the Mid-Norfolk Railway has hired a number of diesels to operate service and special event trains. Visiting diesel locomotives that have operated service trains on the preserved Mid-Norfolk Railway are shown in the following table:

References

Mid-Norfolk Railway